Xining International Academy (XIA) is an international school in Xining, Qinghai, China established in 1997. It serves grades PreK through 12 and is located on the third floor of Xining No. 4 Secondary School. As of 2018 the school had about 80 students from 22 countries.

History 
Since 1997, Xining International Academy (XIA) has graduated six classes. It is the only accredited international school in the entire province of Qinghai, and thus the only location in Qinghai where a student can take AP (Advanced Placement) tests.

School Culture 
XIA has developed its own culture, and students who attend can benefit greatly from the international setting. Students from various countries attend, the curriculum is mostly American, and it is located in a predominantly Chinese-speaking region.

It teaches Chinese to help students understand Chinese religions and cultures. XIA encourages students to be proactive, kind, helpful, and culturally appropriate, as well as to remember their heritage.

XIA is an active member of its community, frequently organizing things like: help for the poor, Christmas fun for orphanages and hospitals, sports days, swaps, performances in multiple locations, and many other things that benefit both the community and the student body.

References

External links

 Xining International Academy

Education in Qinghai
Xining
International schools in China
1997 establishments in China
Educational institutions established in 1997